Natalka Husar (born 1951) is an American-born Canadian painter. She is known for work that draws on aspects of Ukrainian culture and history, the émigré experience, and her feminist concerns.

Early life and education
Natalka Husar’s Ukrainian-born parents, Daria Struk  and Wasyl Husar  and brother Danylo  emigrated from a post-WWII Displaced Persons camp in Germany to the United States. They Settled in New Jersey, where Natalka Husar was born. She earned a Bachelor of Fine Arts degree from Rutgers University in 1973, moving to Toronto Canada shortly after.

Work and themes 
Husar’s earliest exhibited works were trompe l’oeile ceramics, but after working as a flight attendant in the early 1980s, she began painting, with subject matter drawn from travel-work experience, and the paradoxes and conflicts of the Ukrainian émigré experience. In 1986, critic Robert Enright  wrote “Husar uses her art as a bracing tonic; splashed in these big confrontational paintings is a conscience and a care that is almost excessive and certainly troubling.”  Cultural Historian George Melnyk  commented on Husar’s leitmotif of inserting herself into paintings as aging, young, different characters, clothed and nude: “she sees the role of the artist as one of disguising elements of the self, of addressing anxieties.” 

Husar taught painting at the Ontario College of Art University as an associate professor from 1990 to 2011  and has been the recipient of numerous arts grants.

Key solo exhibitions

2009-2012. Burden of Innocence 
A collaboration and touring exhibition with the Macdonald Stewart Art Centre (now the Art Gallery of Guelph), McMaster Museum of Art, Museum London, Tom Thomson Art Gallery and the MacKenzie Art Gallery. It was also shown at the Douglas Udell galleries in Edmonton and Vancouver.

Devised as a history play in three acts, Husar’s painting were interwoven social narratives between Ukrainian society and Soviet-style attitudes through fictional characters and her persona-characters. The concluding triptych painting includes a banquet of these characters in the form of a trial.  TheBurden of Innocence exhibition was accompanied by two publications, Husar Handbook  and a limited edition artist bookwork Burden of Innocence and a double-book version.

2002-2002. Blond with Dark Roots 
Organized by the Art Gallery of Hamilton, and toured to the Winnipeg Art Gallery, Justina M. Barnicke Gallery (now part of the Art Museum at the University of Toronto) and the Tom Thomson Memorial Art Gallery (now the Tom Thomson Art Gallery). The catalogue texts examined Husar’s use of fictional female identities, including poems by Janice Kulyk Keefer  written in the voices of the characters in the paintings.

1995-1996. Black Sea Blue 
Organized by the Rosemont Art Gallery in Regina and toured to Garnet Press Gallery (Toronto), the Douglas Udell galleries in Vancouver and Edmonton, The Robert McLaughlin Gallery and the Mendel Art Gallery in Saskatoon (now Remai Modern).

1991-1992. True Confessions 
Organized by the Woltjen/Udell Gallery – shown in Vancouver and Edmonton – and toured to Garnet Press Gallery (Toronto), and Plug-In, Winnipeg. Catalogue essayists Robert Enright and Donna Lypchuk examining the “psycho-social awareness” and “feminism” in Husar’s paintings

1988-1989. Milk and Blood 
Organized by The Floating Curatorial Gallery at Women in Focus in Vancouver, which toured to Ukrainian Cultural and Educational Centre in Winnipeg, Garnet Press Gallery (Toronto), Forest City Gallery  the Laurentian University Museum and Arts Centre in Sudbury, Latitude 53, Edmonton  and The Station Gallery, Whitby. Essayist Grace Thomson defined the themes in Husar's paintings “as the contradictions of ethnicity and gender expectations and describes how this work addresses patriarchal ethnic culture."

Selected group exhibitions 
 2015-2018. Living Building Thinking: art and expressionism, organized and circulated by the McMaster Museum of Art.
 2015-2016. The Ukrainian Diaspora: Women Artists 1908–2015, The Ukrainian Museum New York.
 2016. Reality Check, Contemporary art in Ukraine since its independence, Ukrainian Institute of Modern Art, Chicago.

Works in Canadian public collections 
 National Gallery of Canada 
 Art Gallery of Ontario 
 Art Gallery of Hamilton 
 Art Gallery of Alberta 
 Beaverbrook Art Gallery 
 Canada Council Art Bank  
 The Canadian Museum of History 
 Glenbow Museum 
 Mackenzie Art Gallery 
 The Robert McLaughlin Gallery 
 McMaster Museum of Art 
 Nickle Galleries, University of Calgary 
 Winnipeg Art Gallery

Further reading 
 Kulyk-Keefer, Janice. Dark Ghost in the Corner: Imagining Ukrainian-Canadian Identity. Saskatoon: Heritage Press, 2005. 
 Melnyk, George.  First Person Plural. Frontenac House, 2018.

External links 
 Artist page at the Canadian Art Database 
 Documentary film: Natalka Husar, The Life of the Artist. Tickle and Scratch Productions, 2013

References 

1951 births
Living people
20th-century Canadian painters
20th-century Canadian women artists
21st-century Canadian painters
21st-century Canadian women artists
Painters from New Jersey
American emigrants to Canada
American people of Ukrainian descent
Canadian people of Ukrainian descent
Rutgers University alumni